Kishinyovsky Uyezd (Кишинёвский уезд) was one of the subdivisions of the Bessarabia Governorate of the Russian Empire. It was situated in the central part of the governorate. Its administrative centre was Chișinău.

Demographics
At the time of the Russian Empire Census of 1897, Kishinyovsky Uyezd had a population of 279,657. Of these, 62.9% spoke Romanian, 19.5% Yiddish, 11.9% Russian, 1.9% Ukrainian, 1.3% Polish, 0.8% German, 0.7% Romani, 0.4% Bulgarian, 0.2% Armenian, 0.1% Greek and 0.1% Tatar as their native language.

References

 
Uezds of Bessarabia Governorate
Bessarabia Governorate